The 1902 Ohio Medical football team was an American football team that represented the Ohio State University College of Medicine in the 1902 college football season.  The medics compiled an impressive 9–1 record, shutting out eight opponents, and outscoring them 252 to 11.  Their sole loss was against Notre Dame, who won by a single point, 6 to 5.

Schedule

References

Ohio Medical
Ohio Medical football seasons
Ohio Medical football